Osirus is a posthumous mixtape album by Ol' Dirty Bastard released on January 4, 2005.

Track listing
"Pop Shots" (prod. by DJ Premier)
"Dirty Dirty" (feat. Rhymefest)
"Go Go Go" (feat. Blahzay Blahzay)
"Who Can Make It Happen Like Dirt?"
"High in the Clouds" (feat. Black Rob)
"Rahzel Skit 1"
"Dirty Run"
"Stand Up" (feat. Cappadonna and Ghostface Killah)
"Don't Stop Ma (Out of Control)"
"If Ya'll Want War" (feat. Royal Flush)
"Pussy Keep Calling"
"Down South"
"Rahzel Skit 2"
"Caked Up" (feat. Baby Sham)
"Fuck Y'all"
"Move Back" (feat. The Lenox Ave. Boys, Jae Millz, Drag-On, Cardan and Terra Blacks)
"Fire" (Dirty Dirty Alt. Version)
"Pop Shots" (Clinton Sparks Remix)

References

Ol' Dirty Bastard albums
2005 mixtape albums
Albums produced by DJ Premier
Albums produced by K-Def
2005 compilation albums
Compilation albums published posthumously